Robert Houston Hale (November 7, 1933 – September 8, 2012) was an American professional baseball player and a former Major League Baseball first baseman.

Born in Sarasota, Florida, Hale attended Lake View High School in Chicago, and was signed by the St. Louis Browns before the  season. In the minor leagues, Hale showed promise in  when he had a batting average of .332 with 30 doubles and had 100 RBI at Aberdeen of the Northern League. The following season, Hale starred as a member of the York White Roses, leading the Class B Piedmont League in doubles with 35. He also hit ten triples, 12 home runs, and drove in 101 runs in 142 games.

Hale made his MLB debut with the Orioles on July 4, 1955, with a single in four at bats against the Washington Senators, and would go on to have a very successful first year, batting .357 in 67 games played. After parts of three more seasons where he played sparingly for the Orioles and spent time in the top levels of the minors, Hale was placed on waivers and picked by the Cleveland Indians for the  season. He got into 70 games for Cleveland in 1960, almost exclusively as a pinch hitter, and batted .300 with 12 RBI. As a pinch hitter for the Yankees who started one game at first base (on September 21), Hale went 2-for-13 and played his final MLB game on October 1, the game in which Roger Maris set his single-season home run mark. Hale singled in his last at bat off Tracy Stallard of the Boston Red Sox, the hurler who surrendered Maris' blow.

Hale did not appear in the 1961 World Series, won by New York in five games, and played 1962 at Triple-A Richmond before leaving the game.

In 376 MLB games played, Hale registered 171 hits, with 29 doubles, two triples and two homers. He batted .273 lifetime with 89 runs batted in.

References

External links

1933 births
2012 deaths
Aberdeen Pheasants players
Baltimore Orioles players
Baseball players from Florida
Charleston Senators players
Cleveland Indians players
Indianapolis Indians players
Louisville Colonels (minor league) players
Major League Baseball first basemen
Montreal Royals players
New York Yankees players
Pine Bluff Judges players
Richmond Virginians (minor league) players
Baseball players from Chicago
Sportspeople from Sarasota, Florida
York White Roses players
Vancouver Mounties players
American expatriate baseball players in Colombia